Phu Phra Bat Buabok is a forest park in Ban Phue District, Udon Thani Province, northeast Thailand.

Named after two Buddha footprints carved into rocks in the Lan Xang style, the park is on a disconnected sandstone hill in the western area of the Phu Phan mountains. Three major kinds of forest are found at the hill: dry dipterocarp forest at the foothills, mixed deciduous forest in the plain surrounding the hill, and dry evergreen forest on the hill itself.

It was officially gazetted on 20 February 1996.  of the area form the Phu Phra Bat Historical Park, established in 1981, covering the 81 cultural sites on the hill at the rock outcrops.

The forest park together with the historical park have been on the tentative list of future World Heritage Sites since 2004.

See also
List of rock formations

References

External links
National Park, Wildlife and Plant Conservation Department

Forest parks of Thailand
Phu Phan Mountains
Protected areas established in 1996
Tourist attractions in Udon Thani province
1996 establishments in Thailand